Idiobiology is a branch of biology which studies individual organisms, or the study of organisms as individuals.

References

Branches of biology